Matthew Songer is an American surgeon and the former chairman of the board of Pioneer Surgical Technology, which he founded in 1992 and based in Marquette, Michigan. His first major product developed was the Songer Cable, used in spine surgeries. Songer and the Songer Cable were featured in the book, Contemporary Management of Spinal Cord Injuries: From Impact to Rehabilitation. Songer earned a biological sciences degree at Michigan Technological University, a medical degree at the University of Illinois and an MBA from the Kellogg School of Management at Northwestern University.

References

External links
Official profile of Matthew Songer from Marquette General Hospital
Excerpt on Matthew Songer from 2007 Michigan Tech Alumni Reunion Awards Program

1957 births
Businesspeople from Chicago
Living people
American surgeons
American chairpersons of corporations
Michigan Technological University alumni
University of Illinois College of Medicine alumni
Kellogg School of Management alumni
20th-century American businesspeople